Mickle Trafford East railway station was located in Mickle Trafford, Cheshire, England. The station was opened by the Cheshire Lines Committee on 1 May 1875, closed to passengers on 12 February 1951 and closed completely on 1 July 1963 by the British Railways Board  It was located where the CLC route to Chester Northgate passed close (and then over) to the Birkenhead Joint Railway line from  - the latter also had its own station nearby, opened in 1889 and closed just a couple of months after Mickle Trafford East.

The buildings were demolished soon after closure and no trace now remains, though a single track remains in use by Mid-Cheshire Line trains between Chester and Manchester Piccadilly. These now join the former BJR line at Mickle Trafford Junction, as the former CLC line to Chester and on to the steelworks and paper mill at Shotton was finally closed in October 1992 (having latterly been used for freight traffic only to allow direct access to both plants from the north).

References

Further reading

Disused railway stations in Cheshire
Railway stations in Great Britain opened in 1875
Railway stations in Great Britain closed in 1963
Former Cheshire Lines Committee stations